Flavius Petrus ( 506–516) was a Roman politician during the reign of Theodoric the Great. He held the consulship without colleague in 516.

According to Cassiodorus, Petrus was from a distinguished noble family (parentum luce conspicuus). Ennodius wrote him a congratulatory letter in 506 for receiving an office, likely of lower rank than vir inlustris. In 510 or 511, Theodoric asked the praefectus urbi Argolicus to appoint Petrus to the Senate.

In 516, Petrus obtained the Roman consulate in the West sine collega (without colleague), after which nothing is known about him.

References 

6th-century Italo-Roman people
6th-century Roman consuls
Imperial Roman consuls
Patricii
Year of birth unknown
Year of death unknown